Richard Perdomo (born October 1, 1985 in Miami, Florida) is an American soccer player of Honduran heritage.

Club career

College
Perdomo attended Gulliver Preparatory School, and played college soccer at Creighton University for two years before transferring to Mercer University for his junior and senior seasons.

Professional
On March 12, 2008, Perdomo signed with the Carolina RailHawks of the USL First Division.  He gained his first start in a 1–1 tie with the Atlanta Silverbacks on April 19, 2008.  In 2009, Perdomo moved to Miami FC.

On June 12, 2009, Perdomo scored his first professional goal in 3-2 loss to Vancouver Whitecaps FC in Vancouver. In July 2009, Miami sold Perdomo's contract to Honduras First Division Club Deportivo Platense. He was released by Platense after the 2009 Apertura season,

International career
Despite being born in the United States, Perdomo has Honduran heritage, and has trained with the Honduras national football team.

Coaching career
He has been a youth soccer coach at Weston F.C. Soccer Programme since 2011 after a season at Kendall Soccer Coalition.

References

External links

 Miami FC bio
 Carolina RailHawks bio
 Mercer bio

1985 births
Living people
Soccer players from Miami
Association football defenders
Honduran footballers
Creighton Bluejays men's soccer players
North Carolina FC players
Miami FC (2006) players
Platense F.C. players
Honduran expatriate footballers
USL First Division players
Liga Nacional de Fútbol Profesional de Honduras players